This is the discography of the American new wave group The Go-Go's. So far they have released 4 studio albums, 3 compilation albums and 16 singles.

Albums

Studio albums

Compilation albums

Singles

Videos

Video albums

Music videos

Notes

References

External links

 
 Planet Go-Go's
 

Discographies of American artists
Rock music group discographies
Pop music group discographies
New wave discographies
Discography